"Pop Song 89" is the opening track and third single released from R.E.M.'s sixth studio album Green. It peaked at number 86 on the Hot 100, and in the UK "Stand" was re-released instead.

Cash Box called it a "cynical parody of pop: but said that "it turns out they’ve created a pop hit despite themselves."

The video was directed by band frontman Michael Stipe and features him and three women, all of them topless, dancing to the song. When MTV asked Stipe to put censor bars on the three women in the video, he superimposed black bars on the chests of all four dancers, himself included, later stating, "a nipple is a nipple." The uncensored video would ultimately be made available through the band's YouTube channel in 2011, albeit with an age restriction attached.

The acoustic version that was used as the single's B-side was also included on disc 4 of the 1993 box set The Automatic Box, along with the other Green B-sides, and the bonus disc of the limited two-disc edition of In Time: The Best of R.E.M. 1988-2003 in 2003.

Cover versions
Motion City Soundtrack covered the song on the Punk Goes 80's compilation album, released on Fearless Records in 2005.

Track listing
All songs written by Bill Berry, Peter Buck, Mike Mills and Michael Stipe.

 "Pop Song 89" – 3:03
 "Pop Song 89" (acoustic) – 2:58

Charts

References

1989 singles
R.E.M. songs
Songs written by Bill Berry
Songs written by Peter Buck
Songs written by Mike Mills
Songs written by Michael Stipe
Warner Records singles
1988 songs
Songs about pop music
Song recordings produced by Scott Litt
Song recordings produced by Michael Stipe
Song recordings produced by Bill Berry
Song recordings produced by Mike Mills
Song recordings produced by Peter Buck
Bubblegum pop songs